David Holding (born 1968) is a British wheelchair athlete. Holding was born with spina bifida, a birth defect that affects the spinal cord, and has been in a wheelchair since childhood. An accountant by training, he competes as an amateur athlete in wheelchair races of all distances. He has won a number of races, but is most well known for being a four-time winner of the London Marathon and the former world record holder, and a Paralympic Games gold medal winner in the 100 meter wheelchair race.

He competed in four Summer Paralympic Games, from 1992 to 2004, in events ranging from the 100 meters to the marathon. In addition to his gold in the 100m T53 at Atlanta 1996, he also won two bronze medals: In the 200m T53 in 1996, and in the 100m T54 at Sydney 2000.

At the 2004 Athens Paralympics, Holding made the final for both the 100m and 200m in the T54 class, but missed out on a medal, finishing fourth and eighth respectively.

Holding is a patron of the National Association for Bikers with a Disability.

References

External links
 

Living people
1968 births
British male wheelchair racers
Paralympic gold medalists for Great Britain
Paralympic bronze medalists for Great Britain
Paralympic athletes of Great Britain
Athletes (track and field) at the 1992 Summer Paralympics
Athletes (track and field) at the 1996 Summer Paralympics
Athletes (track and field) at the 2000 Summer Paralympics
Athletes (track and field) at the 2004 Summer Paralympics
Paralympic wheelchair racers
Medalists at the 1996 Summer Paralympics
Medalists at the 2000 Summer Paralympics
Commonwealth Games medallists in athletics
Commonwealth Games silver medallists for England
People with spina bifida
Athletes (track and field) at the 1994 Commonwealth Games
Paralympic medalists in athletics (track and field)
20th-century British people
Medallists at the 1994 Commonwealth Games